Archon II: Adept is a 1984 strategy/action video game developed by Free Fall Associates' Jon Freeman, Paul Reiche III and Anne Westfall, and published by Electronic Arts for various platforms. It takes place on a game board, except that when a piece lands on another player's piece, both are moved to a battle arena where they duel to the death. It is the sequel to the 1983 Archon: The Light and the Dark, which had a chess motif.

Gameplay 

Adept is a game for two players or one player against the computer. The starting side can be chosen or randomized. The side that goes second receives more magical power. Order plays with yellow pieces and Chaos with blue on a game board with concentric bands of Fire, Air, Water, and Earth, two Void squares, and two decorative citadels. Each player starts with four wizards called "Adepts" that can place other pieces into play.

Adept introduces resource management in the form of magical power. Magic is gained by having pieces on power points, and spent as an Adept moves or casts a spell. The summoning spell places a demon (which are common to both players) or elemental (specific to each) piece on the board, where it incurs a per-turn upkeep cost. Adepts can also cast spells that heal, hinder, or remove pieces. Or they can cast Apocalypse, which makes the citadels uproot, transform into luminous Adepts that base their strength on the state of the board, and face each other in a Void arena for the outcome of the game.

Order and Chaos alternate turns. On a turn, a player must move a piece or use an Adept to cast a spell. Summoned pieces may move any number of squares in their elemental band, or one square in any direction. Adepts teleport anywhere. Neither may enter occupied squares, except to attack an opponent's piece by ending the turn on its square. An Adept piece can target spells onto the elemental band it is on. Pieces can be summoned into empty squares or, for a surcharge, directly onto the opponent's summoned piece. The cost of summoning and maintaining a piece varies per type.

There are four power points on the outer edges of one elemental band at a time. After each player has taken their turn, the points move one band inward. Two stationary power points with a lower income rate are on the Void squares. The game is won by having pieces on all six power points at the same time, by destroying all the enemy's pieces, or by winning Apocalypse. Conversely, a player who is unable to move during their turn loses instantly. The computer can concede to a human player, typically when down to a single Adept with no magical power to summon new pieces for several turns. If a player loses their last Adept, "the Masters intervene" triggering Apocalypse.

Combat 

Pieces in battle are moved to an arena to fight in real time. Pieces can move and attack in eight directions. A chime sounds (higher for Order, lower for Chaos) when their attack has recharged. Attacks that land decrease the target's life bar. Once a life bar is depleted, the piece dies and is removed from the game. The survivor is returned to the board, its injuries persisting. Combat can end in a draw if both pieces die.

In Archon, a piece would either have a melee attack, a projectile, or deal damage in an area around itself. Adept elaborates on this. Chimeras cycle between three attacks, juggernauts transform to and from their own projectiles, and krakens' projectiles lose strength as they travel. Adepts can switch between moving the piece and guiding its projectile in flight, and gorgons sap speed instead of health. The previous game's area-attacking pieces, phoenix and banshee, are revisited as firebirds, which can abort attacks, and wraiths, which drain health and are invisible save as they attack or reload (or against computer opponents.) Sirens must be stationary to sing, and their singing automatically damages their opponents.

In Archon, the battlefield had obstacles that blocked pieces and projectiles. Adept elaborates on this as well. In battles on Earth squares obstacles act in Archon, in Water they slow, in Air they slow pieces and divert projectiles, and in Fire they admit projectiles but damage pieces. Void arenas are empty.

Reception
II Computing stated that the Apple II version of Archon II "is even more challenging than its predecessor, and features exciting innovations", and concluded "it's good to see a sequel to a successful game that is not only as good as the first but extends the boundaries of the game's system". Reviewing the Amiga version, Computer Gaming World "recommend both Archon and Adept" for those interested in challenging strategy games.

See also
Archon Ultra

References

External links 
 Archon II: Adept at Atari Mania
 
 
 Box, manual and screenshots
Review in GAMES magazine

1984 video games
Amiga games
Amstrad CPC games
Apple II games
Ariolasoft games
Atari 8-bit family games
Commodore 64 games
Digital board games
Electronic Arts games
Multiplayer and single-player video games
Turn-based strategy video games
Video game sequels
ZX Spectrum games